The 1942 Minnesota Golden Gophers football team represented the University of Minnesota in the 1942 Big Ten Conference football season. In their first year under head coach George Hauser, the Golden Gophers compiled a 5–4 record and outscored their opponents by a combined total of 152 to 91.

Tackle Dick Wildung was named an All-American by the Walter Camp Football Foundation, Associated Press, Stern, Collier's/Grantland Rice, Look Magazine. Wildung was also named All-Big Ten first team.

Dick Wildung was awarded the Team MVP Award.

The Gophers hosted the U.S. Navy Pre-Flight school at the University of Iowa. The Pre-Flight team was coached by Bernie Bierman, who had coached the Golden Gophers to five national titles between 1934 and 1941, and resumed coaching the Golden Gophers in 1945.

Total attendance for the season was 231,307, which averaged to 38,551. The season high for attendance was against Michigan.

Schedule

Game summaries

Michigan

In the fifth week of the season, Minnesota defeated Michigan, 16–14. Tom Kuzma ran for touchdowns in the first and fourth quarters, and Jim Brieske converted both PATs. Bill Daley, who would go on to play for Michigan in 1943, ran 44 yards for a tying touchdown in the second quarter.

References

Minnesota
Minnesota Golden Gophers football seasons
Minnesota Golden Gophers football